Effective rate may refer to:

 Effective tax rate
 Effective interest rate